Spring Creek is a  tributary of Bald Eagle Creek in Centre County, Pennsylvania in the United States.

Spring Creek passes through a water gap in Bald Eagle Mountain and joins Bald Eagle Creek at Milesburg.

The stream is the site of a kayak and canoe slalom training center, located along Sunnyside Boulevard in Bellefonte. Removal of the McCoy & Linn dam in 2007 now permits a Class I whitewater run of about 3 miles (at higher water levels) from Bellefonte to Milesburg.

Tributaries
Slab Cabin Run

See also
List of rivers of Pennsylvania
Wallace Run (Bald Eagle Creek)

References

External links
U.S. Geological Survey: PA stream gaging stations

Rivers of Pennsylvania
Tributaries of the West Branch Susquehanna River
Rivers of Centre County, Pennsylvania